The 2021 Basketball Champions League Americas season was the 14th edition of the top-tier level professional club basketball competition in the Americas and the second of the Basketball Champions League Americas (BCLA) since launched by FIBA in 2019. The season began on 31 January 2021 and ended on 13 April 2021.

Flamengo won its second continental championship after defeating Real Estelí in the final in Managua. As champions, Flamengo also qualified for the 2022 FIBA Intercontinental Cup.

Team allocation
A total of 12 teams from 6 countries participated in the 2020–21 Basketball Champions League Americas.

Teams
League positions after eventual playoffs of the previous season shown in parentheses. Because Peñarol and Aguada from Uruguay were not able to participation due to national restrictions, Minas and Obras Sanitarias were given wild cards by FIBA.  Universidad de Concepción replaced Chilean champions Valdivia, who withdrew.

The labels in the parentheses show how each team qualified for the place of its starting round:

 1st, 2nd, etc.: League position after Playoffs
 Abd: Abandoned seasons due to COVID-19 pandemic
 TH: Title holders
 WC: Qualified through Wild Card

Group phase
The 12 teams are drawn into four groups of three, while taking into account geographic location. In each group, teams play against each other home-and-away, in a round-robin format. The group winners and runners-up advance to the quarterfinals, while the remaining team in each group is eliminated.

Group A

Group B

Group C

Group D

Playoffs

The playoffs, also called the Final Eight, began on 10 April and ended on 13 April 2021. All games were played in the Alexis Arguello Sports Complex in the Nicaraguan capital Managua.

Bracket

Awards

Most Valuable Player

Statistics
The following were the statistical leaders in the 2021 season.

Individual statistic leaders

Individual game highs

References

External links

2020–21
2020–21 in South American basketball
2020–21 in North American basketball